Roberta Elizabeth Marshall Cowell (8 April 1918 – 11 October 2011) was a British racing driver and Second World War fighter pilot. She was the first known British trans woman to undergo gender-affirming surgery in 1948.

Early life
Roberta Cowell was one of three children of Major-General Sir Ernest Marshall Cowell KBE CB (1886–1971) and Dorothy Elizabeth Miller (1886–1962). 

Roberta Cowell attended Whitgift School, a boys' public school in Croydon and was an enthusiastic member of the school's Motor Club, along with John Cunningham, who would later be famous as an RAF night fighter ace and test pilot. Towards the end of her school days, she visited Belgium, Germany, and Austria with a school friend. At the time, one of her hobbies was photography and filmmaking, and she was briefly arrested in Germany for shooting a cine film of a group of Nazis drilling. She secured her release by agreeing to destroy the film, but was able to substitute unused film stock, and keep the original footage.

Cowell left school at the age of 16 to join General Aircraft Limited as an apprentice aircraft engineer, but soon left to join the Royal Air Force, becoming an acting pilot officer on probation on 4 August 1936; Cowell began training, but was discharged because of airsickness.

In 1936, Cowell began studying engineering at University College London. Also in that year, she began motor-racing, winning her class at the Land's End Speed Trial in a Riley. She gained initial experience of the sport by sneaking into the area where cars were serviced at the Brooklands racing circuit, wearing mechanic's overalls, and offering help to any driver or mechanic who wanted it. By 1939, she owned three cars and had competed in the 1939 Antwerp Grand Prix.

Second World War

On 28 December 1940, Cowell was commissioned into the Royal Army Service Corps as second lieutenant, and in June 1941, married Diana Margaret Zelma Carpenter (1917–2006), who also had been an engineering student at UCL with an interest in motor racing. Cowell served in Iceland before transferring from the Army to the RAF on 24 January 1942 with the rank of pilot officer (temporary). She had obtained a private pilot's licence before the war and completed RAF flying training at RAF Ansty.

Cowell served a tour with a front–line Spitfire squadron and then briefly as an instructor. By June 1944, she was flying with No. 4 Squadron RAF, a squadron assigned to the task of aerial reconnaissance. During the course of the war the squadron had flown a variety of aircraft types but by mid–1944 it was flying the Spitfire PR. XI, an unarmed, camera-equipped version of the Supermarine Spitfire. She passed out but the aircraft continued flying on its own for around an hour over German-occupied France while being subjected to German anti-aircraft fire, she regained semi-consciousness at low altitude and was able to fly back to the squadron's base at RAF Gatwick.

By October 1944, 4 Squadron was based at Deurne, Belgium, on the outskirts of Antwerp and its Spitfires were supplemented by an allocation of Hawker Typhoon FR IBs, a photo-reconnaissance version of the Hawker Typhoon fighter-bomber. On 18 November 1944, Cowell was piloting one of a pair of Typhoons<ref group="Note">She was flying Typhoon number EK429,see: Franks (2000). The other aircraft was flown by Flt. Lt. Draper.</ref> on a low-level sortie near Bocholt, Germany. South east of Kessel, Cowell attacked targets on the ground, but her aircraft's engine was knocked out and its wing holed by German anti-aircraft fire. Cowell was flying too low to bail-out and instead jettisoned the cockpit canopy and glided her Typhoon to a successful deadstick crash-landing. She was able to contact her companion by radio and confirm she was unhurt before being captured by German troops. Cowell made two escape attempts, reasoning that the chances of success were greatest if the attempt was made quickly, while still close to the front–line. However, the attempts failed and she was taken further into Germany, spending several weeks in solitary confinement at an interrogation centre for captured Allied aircrew, before being moved to the prisoner–of–war camp Stalag Luft I.

Cowell remained a prisoner for around five months, occupying the time by teaching classes in automotive-engineering to fellow inmates. In her biography, she describes the situational sexual behaviour shown by some of the camp's Allied prisoners, and her discomfort at being propositioned by prisoners who assumed she also wanted to take part in this. She was offered the part of a woman in a camp theatrical production but turned it down, as she thought this would make her appear homosexual in the eyes of other prisoners. Towards the end of the war, food became short at the camp; Cowell lost  in weight, and later described killing the camp's cats and eating them raw because of hunger.

By April 1945, the advancing Red Army was approaching. The initial German intention was to evacuate the camp, but the prisoners refused to leave. After negotiations between the senior American officer and the Kommandant, the Germans guarding Stalag Luft I abandoned it and evacuated towards the west, leaving the prisoners behind. The unguarded and undefended camp was reached by the Red Army on the night of 30 April 1945. Commonwealth personnel were flown back to the United Kingdom some two weeks later, between 12 and 14 May, by aircraft of the United States Army Air Forces.

Postwar life
After demobilization, Cowell was engaged in a number of business ventures until, in 1946, she founded a motor-racing team and competed in events across Europe, including the Brighton Speed Trials and the Grand Prix at Rouen-Les-Essarts.

However her autobiography describes this as a time of great distress. She also experienced traumatic flashback when watching the film Mine Own Executioner, in which the hero is shot-down by anti-aircraft fire while flying a Spitfire.

In 1948, Cowell separated from her wife and, suffering from depression, she sought out a leading Freudian psychiatrist of the time, but was unsatisfied by the help he offered. Sessions with a second Freudian psychiatrist, described in her biography only as a Scottish man with a less orthodox approach to his profession, gradually revealed, in her own words, that her "unconscious mind was predominantly female" and "feminine side of my nature, which all my life I had known of and severely repressed, was very much more fundamental and deep-rooted than I had supposed."

Transition and surgery
By 1950, Cowell was taking large doses of oestrogen, but was still living as a man. She had become acquainted with Michael Dillon, a British physician who was the first trans man to get a phalloplasty, after reading his 1946 volume Self: A Study in Endocrinology and Ethics. This work proposed that individuals should have the right to change gender, to have the kind of body they desired. The two developed a close friendship. Dillon subsequently carried out an inguinal orchiectomy on Cowell. Secrecy was necessary for this as the procedure was then illegal in the United Kingdom under so-called "mayhem" laws and no surgeon would agree to perform it openly.

Cowell then presented herself to a private Harley Street gynaecologist and was able to obtain from him a document stating she was intersex. This allowed her to have a new birth certificate issued, with her recorded sex changed to female. She had a vaginoplasty on 15 May 1951. The operation was carried out by Sir Harold Gillies, widely considered the father of plastic surgery, with the assistance of American surgeon Ralph Millard. Gillies had operated on Michael Dillon, but vaginoplasty was then an entirely novel procedure, which Gillies had only performed experimentally on a cadaver. The name on her birth certificate was changed on 17 May of that year.

Later life
By 1954, her two business ventures, a racing car engineering company (Leacroft of Egham) and a clothing company had both ceased trading and her change of legal gender had made it impossible for her to continue Grand Prix motor racing. However, in March 1954, news of her gender reassignment broke, gaining public interest around the world. Cowell's biography was published soon after this, earning a further £1,500 (£ in ).

In the United States, the widespread sensation caused by the news stories about Christine Jorgensen in 1952 had introduced the American public to the concept of changing sex, and the press had continued to print a steady stream of stories about others who had done so, mostly trans women. Such reports tended to conflate the unrelated concepts of sexual orientation and gender identity, so transsexuality had become closely associated in the public mind with male homosexuality (during this period, highly taboo) and effeminacy amongst men. Cowell's story consequently appeared confusing as it disrupted this narrative. Her marriage, her parenting of children, her wartime combat service and her association with motor racing were, during this period, perceived as strong markers of heterosexual masculinity; these aspects of her life were described repeatedly in press reports.

She continued to be active in motor racing and attracted some publicity for winning the 1957 Shelsley Walsh Speed Hill Climb. In November 1958, she acquired an ex-RAF de Havilland Mosquito (number TK-655, civil registration G-AOSS). Her intention was to use the aircraft for a record-breaking flight over the South Atlantic. However, the project fell through due to a lack of suitable engines and in 1958 she became bankrupt with debts totaling £12,580 (approximately £ in ). By 1959, G-AOSS was a derelict hulk and its remains were scrapped in 1960.

Her financial difficulties continued, as she found it difficult to get employment. In later years, she largely dropped out of the public eye. However she was still an active figure in British motor racing in the 1970s. She also continued flying and by this time had logged over 1,600 hours as a pilot.

A brief interview with Sunday Times journalist Michael Bateman appeared in March 1972, when she was working on an (unpublished) second biography. In the interview, she stated she was an intersex individual with the chromosomal abnormality XX male syndrome, and that the condition justified her transition. She also spoke in derogatory terms of those individuals with XY chromosomes who also underwent male to female gender reassignment, saying "The people who have followed me have often been those with male chromosomes, XY. So they've been normal people who've turned themselves into freaks by means of the operation."

In the 1990s, Cowell moved into sheltered accommodation in Hampton, London although she continued to own and drive large, powerful cars. She died on 11 October 2011. Her funeral was attended by only six people and (on her instructions) was unpublicised; her death was not publicly reported until two years later, when a profile of her was printed in The Independent newspaper in October 2013. The New York Times'' published Cowell's obituary on 5 June 2020.

See also

 List of transgender people
 List of transgender-related topics

Explanatory notes

References

Citations

General and cited references

External links
 Newsreel report of Cowell's motor-racing success in 1957 (British Pathe)

1918 births
2011 deaths
20th-century English people
20th-century English women
Alumni of University College London
American LGBT sportspeople
British Army personnel of World War II
British World War II fighter pilots
British World War II prisoners of war
English female racing drivers
English LGBT people
English racing drivers
Intersex military personnel
Intersex women
LGBT nobility
LGBT racing drivers
Military personnel from London
People educated at Whitgift School
Royal Air Force officers
Royal Air Force pilots of World War II
Royal Army Service Corps officers
Shot-down aviators
Transgender military personnel
Transgender sportswomen
Transgender women
World War II prisoners of war held by Germany